The 407th Military Hospital was established in February 1933 in Chernihiv. Today it is a functional military hospital of the Ukrainian Armed Forces.

See also 

 List of hospitals in Chernihiv
 List of hospitals in Ukraine

References

Buildings and structures in Chernihiv
Hospitals in Ukraine
Military hospitals
Military installations of Ukraine
Hospitals established in 1933